"Talk That Talk" is a song recorded by South Korean girl group Twice. It was released on August 26, 2022, by JYP Entertainment and Republic Records as the lead single of the group's eleventh extended play, Between 1&2. The track was composed and arranged by Woo Min Lee "collapsedone" and Like (MRCH), with lyrics written by Danke.

Background and release 
On July 12, 2022, plans for Twice's comeback were released. On July 26, the track list was released, revealing the title track for Between 1&2 would be "Talk That Talk". On August 5, a schedule was released with the dates of teasers. On August 9, the group released a concept video along with a snippet of the single on TikTok. On August 24 and 25, the group released two teasers for the music video. On August 26, the song's music video was released.

Composition 
"Talk That Talk" was composed by Lee Woo-min "Collapsedone", who previously co-composed some of Twice's singles, such as "Knock Knock" and "The Feels". The lyrics were written by the lyricist team Danke. "Talk That Talk" was composed in the key of E♭ Minor with a tempo of 120 beats per minute. Member Dahyun described it as an "addictive" retro pop song "that reminds you of the year 2000". Jeongyeon noted that the song's concept is Y2K, and the track embodies the retro concept. Lyrically, the song is about "trying to get the other person to say everything on their mind", which relates to the theme of the music video, where Twice undertakes a mission to make Once say "I love you" to Twice.

Music video
On August 24 and 25, the group released two teasers for the music video of "Talk That Talk". The next day, on August 26, "Talk That Talk" was released with an accompanying music video.

The music video is about Twice  looking for codes, on a mission to confess their love to their fandom, Once. The concept of the video is Y2K and features fragments of Y2K-themed images and styles.

Promotion and live performances 
JYP Entertainment released concept photos and video teasers to promote Between 1&2 and the single.

The group held a comeback livestream on the afternoon of August 26 to communicate with fans. Additionally, Twice performed "Talk That Talk" on the MTV show Fresh Out Live on the same day. Followed by performances on KBS 2TV 'Music Bank', MBC 'Show! Music Core' and 'SBS' 'Inkigayo' to promote the song. Jihyo was not present during the first week of promotion after she tested positive for COVID-19.

Accolades

Credits and personnel 
Credits adapted from Melon.

 Twice – vocals
 Danke (Lalala Studio) – lyricist
 Lee Woo-min "Collapsedone" – composer, arranger, synthesizer, bass, guitar, computer programming, vocal directer
 MRCH – background vocals, composer, arranger, computer programming, vocal directer
 Eom Se-hee – recording
 Lee Sang-yeop – recording
 Goo Hye-jin – recording
 Tony Maserati – mixing
 Kwon Nam-woo – mastering

Charts

Weekly charts

Monthly charts

Year-end charts

Certifications 

! scope="col" colspan="3" | Streaming
|-

Release history

References 

Twice (group) songs
2022 singles
2022 songs
Korean-language songs
JYP Entertainment singles